Matt Saunders may refer to:

 Matt Saunders (artist) (born 1975), American contemporary artist
 Matt Saunders (rugby union, born 1988), rugby union player for the Philippines national rugby union team
 Matt Saunders (rugby union, born 1982), rugby union player for Southland and Highlanders Super Rugby